Asperula mungieri is a species of flowering plant in the family Rubiaceae.

Description
Asperula mungieri was first described in 1849 and is endemic to Greece.

It has one subspecies.

References

mungieri
Taxa named by Pierre Edmond Boissier
Taxa named by Theodor von Heldreich
Flora of Greece